Trofim Denisovich Lysenko (20 November 1976) was a Soviet agronomist and pseudo-scientist. He was a strong proponent of Lamarckism, and rejected Mendelian genetics in favour of his own idiosyncratic, pseudoscientific ideas later termed Lysenkoism.

In 1940, Lysenko became director of the Institute of Genetics within the USSR's Academy of Sciences, and he used his political influence and power to suppress dissenting opinions and discredit, marginalize, and imprison his critics, elevating his anti-Mendelian theories to state-sanctioned doctrine.

Soviet scientists who refused to renounce genetics were dismissed from their posts and left destitute. Hundreds if not thousands of others were imprisoned. Several were sentenced to death as enemies of the state, including the botanist Nikolai Vavilov. Lysenko's ideas and practices contributed to the famines that killed millions of Soviet people; the adoption of his methods from 1958 in the People's Republic of China had similarly calamitous results, culminating in the Great Chinese Famine of 1959 to 1962.

Life and career
The son of Denis and Oksana Lysenko, Trofim Lysenko was born into a peasant family of Ukrainian ethnicity in Karlivka, Poltava Governorate (present-day Poltava Oblast, Ukraine) on 29 September 1898.

As a young man working at the Kyiv Agricultural Institute (now the National University of Life and Environmental Sciences of Ukraine), Lysenko found himself interested in agriculture, where he worked on a few different projects, one involving the effects of temperature variation on the life-cycle of plants. This later led him to consider how he might use this work to convert winter wheat into spring wheat. He named the process "jarovization" in Russian, and later translated it as "vernalization".

The conversion of winter wheat into spring wheat was not a new discovery. Scientific experiments had been done by Nikolai Vavilov. It was Vavilov who initially supported Lysenko and encouraged him in his work. Lysenko had a difficult time trying to grow various crops (such as peas and wheat) through the harsh winters. However, when he announced success, he was praised in the Soviet newspaper Pravda for his claims to have discovered a method to fertilize fields without using fertilizers or minerals, and to have shown that a winter crop of peas could be grown in Azerbaijan, "turning the barren fields of the Transcaucasus green in winter, so that cattle will not perish from poor feeding, and the peasant Turk will live through the winter without trembling for tomorrow."

Lysenko worked with different wheat crops to try to convert them to grow in different seasons. Another area Lysenko found himself interested in was the effect of heat on plant growth. He believed that every plant needed a determinate amount of heat throughout its lifetime. He attempted to correlate the time and the amount of heat required by a particular plant to go through various phases of development. To get his data he looked at the amount of growth, how many days went by, and the temperature on those days, instead of measuring any actual heat. In trying to determine the effects, he was making mistakes in statistical analysis of data. He was confronted by Maksimov, who was an expert on thermal plant development. Lysenko did not take well to this or any criticism. After this encounter, Lysenko boldly claimed that mathematics had no place in biology.

His experimental research in improved crop yields earned him the support of the Soviet leader Joseph Stalin, especially following the famine and loss of productivity resulting from crop failures and forced collectivization in several regions of the Soviet Union in the early 1930s.

Vernalization

In 1927, at the age of 29, working at an agricultural experiment station in Azerbaijan, Lysenko embarked on the research that would lead to his 1928 paper on vernalization, which drew wide attention because of its potential practical implications for Soviet agriculture. Severe cold and lack of winter snow had destroyed many early winter-wheat seedlings. By treating wheat seeds with moisture as well as cold, Lysenko induced them to bear a crop when planted in spring. Lysenko coined the term "Jarovization" (яровизация) to describe this chilling process, which he used to make the seeds of winter cereals behave like spring cereals. (Because spring cereals are called Jarovoe in Russian – from jarovój, an archaic adjective meaning spring, especially in relation to crops). However, this method had already been known by farmers since the 1800s, and had recently been discussed in detail by Gustav Gassner in 1918. Lysenko himself translated Jarovization as "vernalization" (from the Latin vernum meaning Spring). Lysenko's claims for increased yields were based on plantings over a few hectares, and he believed that the vernalized transformation could be inherited, that the offspring of a vernalized plant would themselves possess the capabilities of the generation that preceded itthat it too would be able to withstand harsh winters or imperfect weather conditions.

Lysenko's theories

Lysenko rejected Mendelian genetic inheritance theory in favour of his own logic. He believed Gregor Mendel's theory to be too reactionary or idealist. Lysenko's ideas were a mixture of his own, those of Russian agronomist Ivan Michurin, and of other Soviet scientists. Through this mixture of ideas, Lysenko founded the "Michurinist" school of thought. The core ideas are that body cells (the soma) determine the quality of an organism's offspring; every part of the body contributes to the germ cells, in the manner of Darwin's theory of pangenesis, though Lysenko denied any such connection.

These ideas were not directly derived from established biological theories such as Mendelian genetics, Lamarckism or Darwinism. He shaped his genetic concepts to support the simple practical purpose of breeding and improving crops. His ideas were also shaped to disprove other claims made by his fellow geneticists. His ideas and genetic claims later began to be termed "Lysenkoism". He claimed that his ideas were not associated with Lamarckism, but there are similarities between the two ideas, such as a belief in the inheritance of acquired characteristics. Some of Lysenko's ideas can also seem to be vitalistic. He claimed that plants are self-sacrificing—they do not die due to a lack of sunlight or moisture but so that healthy ones may live and when they die they deposit themselves over the growing roots to help the new generation survive.

Lysenko believed that in one generation of a hybridized crop, the desired individual could be selected, mated again and continue to produce the same desired product, not worrying about separation/segregation in future breeds. For that to work, he had to assume that after a lifetime of developing (acquiring) the best set of traits to survive, those were passed down to the next generation. That assumption disregarded the potential for variation or mutation.

Lysenko did not believe in genes and only spoke about them to say that they did not exist. He instead believed that any body, once alive, obtained heredity. That meant that the entirety of the body was able to pass on the hereditary information of that organism, and was not entirely dependent on a special element such as DNA or genes. That puzzled biologists at that time because it went against established notions of heredity and inheritance. It also contradicted the Mendelian principles that most biologists had been using to base their ideas on. Most scientists believed that Lysenko's ideas were not credible, because they did not truly explain the mechanisms of inheritance. Biologists now consider that his beliefs are pseudo-scientific, with little relationship to genetics.

Lysenko argued that there is not only competition, but also mutual assistance among individuals within a species, and that mutual assistance also exists between different species.

According to Lysenko,

Another of Lysenko's theories was that obtaining more milk from cows did not depend on their genetics but on how they were treated. The better they were handled and taken care of, the more milk would be obtained; Lysenko and his followers were well known for taking very good care of their livestock. Lysenko claimed that the cuckoo was born when young birds such as warblers were fed hairy caterpillars by the parent (rather than host) birds; this claim failed to recognise that the cuckoos he described were brood parasites. Lysenkoites believed that fertilization was not random, but that there was specific selection of the best mate. For reasons like these, Lysenkoism can be viewed as pseudo-scientific.

After World War II ended, Lysenko took an interest in the works of Olga Lepeshinskaya, an older feldsher and biologist, who claimed to be able to create cells from egg yolk and non-cellular matter. Lepeshinskaya recognized common ground between her ideas and Lysenko's. By combining both of their ideas it was possible to proclaim that cells could grow from non-cellular material and that the predicted ratios of Mendelian genetics and meiosis were incorrect, thus undermining the basis of modern cytology, as well as genetics.

Consequences of Lysenkoism

Lysenko forced farmers to plant seeds very close together since, according to his "law of the life of species", plants from the same "class" never compete with one another. Lysenko played an active role in the famines that killed millions of Soviet people and his practices prolonged and exacerbated the food shortages. The People's Republic of China under Mao Zedong adopted his methods starting in 1958, with calamitous results, culminating in the Great Chinese Famine of 1959 to 1962, in which some 15–55 million people died.

Outside the Soviet Union, scientists spoke critically: British biologist S. C. Harland lamented that Lysenko was "completely ignorant of the elementary principles of genetics and plant physiology" (Bertram Wolfe, 2017). Criticism from foreigners did not sit well with Lysenko, who loathed Western "bourgeois" scientists and denounced them as tools of imperialist oppressors. He especially detested the American-born practice of studying fruit flies, the workhorse of modern genetics. He called such geneticists "fly lovers and people haters".

During the 1930s and '40s, the VASKhNIL served as a floor for debate between Lysenkoists and geneticists. On August 7, 1948, at the end of a week-long session organized by Lysenko and approved by Stalin, the V.I. Lenin Academy of Agricultural Sciences (VASKhNIL) announced that from that point on Lysenkoism would be taught as "the only correct theory." Soviet scientists were forced to denounce any work that contradicted Lysenko. Several geneticists who refused to denounce the theory were executed (including Izrail Agol, Solomon Levit, Grigorii Levitskii, Georgii Karpechenko and Georgii Nadson) or sent to labor camps. One prominent critic of Lysenko, the famous Soviet geneticist and president of the Agriculture Academy, Nikolai Vavilov, was arrested in 1940 and died in prison in 1943. Before the 1930s, the Soviet Union had arguably the best genetics community. According to The Atlantic writer Sam Kean, "Lysenko gutted it, and by some accounts, set Russian biology and agronomy back a half-century". Lysenko's work was eventually recognized as fraudulent by some, "but not before he had wrecked the lives of many and destroyed the reputation of Russian biology" according to scientist Peter Gluckman.

Politics

During the early and mid twentieth century the Soviet Union went through war and revolution. Political oppression caused tension within the state but also promoted the flourishing of science: this was possible due to the flow of resources and demand for results. Lysenko aimed to manipulate various plants such as wheat and peas to increase their production, quality, and quantity, while he impressed political officials with his success in motivating peasants to return to farming.

The Soviet Union's collectivist reforms forced the confiscation of agricultural landholdings from peasant farmers and heavily damaged the country's overall food production, and the dispossessed peasant farmers posed new problems for the regime. Many had abandoned the farms altogether; many more waged resistance to collectivization by poor work quality and pilfering. The dislocated and disenchanted peasant farmers were a major political concern to the USSR's leadership. Lysenko became prominent during this period by advocating radical but unproven agricultural methods, and also promising that the new methods provided wider opportunities for year-round work in agriculture. He proved himself very useful to the Soviet leadership by reengaging peasants to return to work, helping to secure from them a personal stake in the overall success of the Soviet revolutionary experiment.

Lysenko's success at encouraging farmers to return to working their lands impressed Stalin, who also approved of Lysenko's peasant background, as Stalin claimed to stand with the proletariat. By the late 1920s, the USSR's leaders had given their support to Lysenko. This support was a consequence, in part, of policies put in place by the Communist Party to rapidly promote members of the proletariat into leadership positions in agriculture, science and industry. Party officials were looking for promising candidates with backgrounds similar to Lysenko's: born of a peasant family, without formal academic training or affiliations to the academic community. Due to close partnership between Stalin and Lysenko, Lysenko acquired an influence over genetics in the Soviet Union during the early and mid twentieth century. Lysenko eventually became the director of Genetics for the Academy of Sciences in 1940, which gave him even more control over genetics. He remained in the position for more than two decades, throughout   the reigns of Stalin and Nikita Khruschchev, until he was relieved of his duties in 1965.

After Stalin
In 1955, an attempt was made to disempower Lysenko, with a letter signed by more than three hundred scientists, the so-called "Letter of three hundred", which was sent to Nikita Khrushchev. It led to Lysenko resigning temporarily but he returned to power through the efforts of Khrushchev. Though Lysenko remained at his post in the Institute of Genetics until 1965, his influence on Soviet agricultural practice had declined after the death of Stalin in 1953. Lysenko retained his position, with the support of the new leader Nikita Khrushchev. However, mainstream scientists re-emerged and found new willingness within Soviet government leadership to tolerate criticism of Lysenko, the first opportunity since the late 1920s. In 1962, three of the most prominent Soviet physicists, Yakov Zeldovich, Vitaly Ginzburg, and Pyotr Kapitsa, presented a case against Lysenko, proclaiming his work as pseudoscience. They also denounced Lysenko's application of political power to silence opposition and eliminate his opponents within the scientific community. These denunciations occurred during a period of structural upheaval in Soviet government, during which the major institutions were purged of the strictly ideological and political machinations which had controlled the work of the Soviet Union's scientific community for several decades under Stalin.

In 1964, physicist Andrei Sakharov spoke out against Lysenko in the General Assembly of the Academy of Sciences of the USSR:

The Soviet press was soon filled with anti-Lysenkoite articles and appeals for the restoration of scientific methods to all fields of biology and agricultural science. In 1965, Lysenko was removed from his post as director of the Institute of Genetics at the Academy of Sciences and restricted to an experimental farm in Moscow's Lenin Hills (the Institute itself was soon dissolved). After Khrushchev's dismissal in 1964, the president of the Academy of Sciences declared that Lysenko's immunity to criticism had officially ended. An expert commission was sent to investigate records kept at Lysenko's experimental farm. His secretive methods and ideas were revealed. A few months later, a devastating critique of Lysenko was made public. Consequently, Lysenko was immediately disgraced in the Soviet Union.

After Lysenko's monopoly on biology and agronomy had ended, it took many years for these sciences to recover in Russia. Lysenko died in Moscow in 1976, and was ultimately interred in the Kuntsevo Cemetery, although the Soviet government refused to announce Lysenko's death for two days after the event and gave his passing only a small note in Izvestia.

Honours and awards
 Hero of Socialist Labor (1945)
 Order of Lenin, eight times (1935, 1945, 1945, 1948, 1949, 1953, 1958, 1961)
 Medal "For Labour Valour" (1959)	
 Jubilee Medal "In Commemoration of the 100th Anniversary of the Birth of Vladimir Ilyich Lenin" (1969)
 Medal "For Valiant Labour in the Great Patriotic War 1941–1945" (1945)
 Medal "In Commemoration of the 800th Anniversary of Moscow" (1947)
 Stalin Prize, three times (1941, 1943, 1949)
Order of the Red Banner of Labor of the Ukrainian SSR (1931) 
 (1950)

Works
 Heredity and Its Variability (1945)
 The Science of Biology Today (1948)

See also
 Jean-Baptiste Lamarck
 VASKhNIL

Notes

References

Further reading

 William deJong-Lambert. The Cold War Politics of Genetic Research (Springer Science+Business Media B.V. 2012)
 Graham, Loren. Lysenko's Ghost: Epigenetics and Russia (Cambridge: Harvard University Press, 2016). online review
 Graham, Loren, Science in Russia and the Soviet Union, (New York: Cambridge University Press, 1993).
 Graham, Loren, What Have We Learned About Science and Technology from the Russian Experience?, (Palo Alto: Stanford University Press, 1998).
 
 Lecourt, Dominique, Proletarian Science ? : The Case of Lysenko, (London: NLB; Atlantic Highlands, N.J. : Humanities Press, 1977). (A Marxist, though anti-Stalinist, history of Lysenkoism)
 Lysenko, Trofim, The Science of Biology Today, (New York: International Publishers, 1948). Text of an address "evoked by the international discussion of the subject of inheritance of acquired characteristics," according to an introductory note. Delivered before a session of a meeting of the V.I. Lenin Academy of Agricultural Sciences on 31 July 1948, when Lysenko, its president, was at the apex of his power. [For an online version of the text see the Lysenko "Report" provided in the External Links section, below.]
 Medvedev, Zhores, The Rise and Fall of T.D. Lysenko, (New York: Columbia University Press, 1969)
 Soyfer, Valery N., Lysenko and the Tragedy of Soviet Science, New Brunswick: Rutgers University Press, 1994.
 Gardner, Martin: Fads and Fallacies in the Name of Science (1957) (Revised and expanded edition of the work originally published in 1952 under the title In the Name of Science). Dover Publications, New York. See Chapter 12 (Lysenkoism).
Somssich, Marc. A Short History of Vernalization (Zenodo (2020) https://doi.org/10.5281/zenodo.3660691).

External links

 Lysenkoism in The Sceptic's Dictionary by Robert Todd Carroll
 Ronald Fisher (1948). What Sort of Man is Lysenko? Listener, 40: 874–75 – contemporary commentary by a British evolutionary biologist
 Letter from Lysenko's parents to Stalin, Pravda, 3 January 1936.
 Lecourt, Dominique, Proletarian Science? The Case of Lysenko (1977), Atlantic Highlands, Humanities Press, London, this digital edition first published 2003 (A Marxist, though anti-Stalinist, history of Lysenkoism)
 BBC program (In Our Time) on Lysenko
 

1898 births
1976 deaths
People from Poltava Oblast
People from Poltava Governorate
Ukrainian Soviet Socialist Republic people
Burials at Kuntsevo Cemetery
First convocation members of the Soviet of the Union
Second convocation members of the Soviet of the Union
Third convocation members of the Soviet of the Union
Fourth convocation members of the Soviet of the Union
Ukrainian biologists
Ukrainian agronomists
Ukrainian inventors
Soviet biologists
Soviet agronomists
Soviet inventors
Agriculture in the Soviet Union
Soviet Union
Soviet Union
Pseudoscientific biologists
Full Members of the USSR Academy of Sciences
Academicians of the VASKhNIL
Foreign Members of the Bulgarian Academy of Sciences
Heroes of Socialist Labour
Recipients of the Order of Lenin
Stalin Prize winners